Chengdu Golden Apple Child Education is one of the major education groups in western China.

It was established in 1985 with a single kindergarten and since then has grown into an education group consisting of four different companies involved in preschool education, elementary school education, middle school education, and educational publishing.

The company has a gross revenue of approximately 100 million RMB per year and employs a total of over 1,200 teachers and 6,000 students.

External links
Golden Apple International Child Education Institution

1985 establishments in China
Education in China